Aelurostrongylus abstrusus is a species of nematode from the family Angiostrongylidae.

Hosts 

Intermediate hosts include:
 land snail Achatina fulica
 land snail Thelidomus aspera

Final hosts include:
 cats (family Felidae)

References

Further reading 
 

Rhabditida
Nematodes described in 1898